Arctostaphylos malloryi is a species of manzanita known by the common name Mallory's manzanita. It is endemic to California.

The plant is native to the Inner North Coast Ranges west and northwest of the Sacramento Valley. It is a resident of the chaparral plant community, often on volcanic soils.

Description
Arctostaphylos malloryi  is a short erect shrub which may exceed one meter in height. Its branches are woolly, glandular, and bristly. The leaves may be woolly to waxy and nearly hairless. They are rounded to oval in shape and 2 to 3 centimeters long.

The bristly inflorescence is a cluster of urn-shaped manzanita flowers which are hairy inside. The fruit is a drupe just under a centimeter wide which is hairy when new and becomes hairless as it ripens.

References

External links
Jepson Manual Treatment
USDA Plants Profile
Photo gallery

malloryi
Endemic flora of California
Natural history of the California chaparral and woodlands
Natural history of the California Coast Ranges
Plants described in 1983